Tsal may refer to:

 Tsal, an Arabic common name for Ziziphus zizyphus (Jujube), a plant.
 Tsal, an aspect of energy in Dzogchen.
 Tsal, or Tzul, the clan name of Georgius Tzul.
 Johnny Tsal, a sports character created by Hugh Troy, as "last" spelled backwards.
 Naama Tsal (1981–2020), an Israeli writer
 TSAL, The Soho Association Limited, in Soho, Hong Kong.